The Gentle Barn is an American nonprofit 501(c)(3) animal sanctuary organization located in Santa Clarita, California; Dittmer, Missouri; and Christiana, Tennessee. Founded by Ellie Laks in 1999, The Gentle Barn's mission is to provide sanctuary for abused animals who would not otherwise be able to find homes.

History 
The Gentle Barn was founded in 1999 on a half-acre property in Tarzana, California. Jay Weiner, who is also Laks' husband, joined the organization in 2002. In 2003, the organization moved to a six-acre property at its current location in Santa Clarita.
Laks cites a childhood love for animals as the inspiration for creating the sanctuary. She also credits animals with helping her heal after an abusive childhood.

The organization began allowing visitors the same year it opened and later added animal-assisted therapy programs for disabled and special-needs children and at-risk youth, including inner-city gang members, drug addicts, and abused children.

In 2012, The Gentle Barn took in 51 animals from the property of Roberto Celedon, a "backyard butcher" who was charged on 13 counts, including three felonies related to cruelty to animals. For its work in the case, The Gentle Barn was honored by Supervisor Michael D. Antonovich of the Fifth District of Los Angeles County.

In 2015, a second Gentle Barn was opened in Knoxville, Tennessee, but relocated to Christiana, Tennessee in 2018. In 2017, a third Gentle Barn was opened in Dittmer, Missouri. The Gentle Barn hopes to eventually open a location in every state in America.

The sanctuary 

The current six-acre property in Santa Clarita, California has horse and cow pastures, a barnyard for the smaller animals, and an organic vegetable garden. It currently houses 170 animals, including cows, horses, pigs, sheep, chickens, llamas, emus, cats, dogs, and birds. The first cow rescued, Buddha, is often used for therapy sessions with quadriplegic children.
Animals at The Gentle Barn are treated with a holistic approach, including acupuncture and veterinary chiropractic methods. The property is completely vegan and does not allow any food products derived from animals.
The property is open for tours on Sundays. A separate facility, the Sun Chlorella Healing Center, is not open to the public and is used to treat the sickest and most traumatized animals.
The Gentle Barn requires $50,000 a month to operate. Most of the funds come through the website, from individual donors, corporate grants, and foundations. Major donors include Ellen DeGeneres, Portia de Rossi, Hilary Swank, Kirstie Alley, Toyota, CBS, William Morris Endeavor, and Princess Cruises. Actress and animal activist Pamela Anderson has also visited The Gentle Barn to feed turkeys on Thanksgiving. In 2011, a lock of hair given by Justin Bieber to Ellen DeGeneres was auctioned for over $40,000, with all proceeds going to The Gentle Barn.

See also 

 Animal-assisted therapy
 Animal welfare
 Animal rights
 Cruelty to animals
 Overpopulation (animals)

References

External links 

 Official website
 
The Gentle Barn on Foursquare
 

Animal charities based in the United States
Animal sanctuaries
Charities based in California
Organizations established in 1999
1999 establishments in California